Mars is a permanent offshore drilling and production tension-leg  oil platform (TLP) operating in Mississippi Canyon blocks 762, 763, 806, 807, 850 and 851 in the Gulf of Mexico and was approved by the MMS in December 1992 with production beginning on July 8, 1996. The leases were acquired by Shell in 1985 and 1988. The platform is a joint venture between Shell Oil Company and BP, with Shell owning the majority share and operating the facility.

Development and production
In October 1993, Shell announced plans to develop Mars utilizing an in-house designed and engineered TLP. The TLP was installed three years later in May at a water depth of 2,940 feet, making it the deepest TLP at the time as measured from its base on the seabed to the top of its tower. The Magnolia Tension-leg Platform has since surpassed the record set by Mars.

Ten of the TLP development wells were predrilled beginning in the fourth quarter of 1993 with the remaining wells drilled with a contract rig installed on the TLP after the facility was constructed and in position.

The oil produced is transported 116 miles via an 18/24-inch diameter pipeline to the Clovelly, LA area, and the gas is transported 55 miles via a 14-inch pipeline to West Delta 143. Both pipelines were installed as part of the Mars development.

Hurricane Katrina
In 2005, Mars was damaged when Hurricane Katrina hit the Gulf of Mexico but returned to production ahead of schedule in May 2006 and was producing slightly above its pre-Katrina rates in July 2006.

Among the first-ever accomplishments were, most notably, the lift of the 1,000 ton damaged rig substructure, the repairs to both of the Mars product export pipelines in 2,000 feet of water and the mooring of the Safe Scandinavia in 3,000 foot water depth.

The Mars recovery project encompassed more than one million man-hours without a recordable injury.

See also
 Offshore oil and gas in the Gulf of Mexico (United States)
 Olympus tension leg platform

References

External links
Discussion board with pictures of platform
Repairs Completed Early on Hurricane-Damaged Oil Platform

Energy infrastructure completed in 1996
Oil platforms off the United States
Petroleum industry in the Gulf of Mexico
Energy infrastructure in Louisiana
Shell plc buildings and structures
BP buildings and structures